medRxiv (pronounced "med-archive") is an Internet site distributing unpublished eprints about health sciences. It distributes complete but unpublished manuscripts in the areas of medicine, clinical research, and related health sciences without charge to the reader. Such manuscripts have yet to undergo peer review and the site notes that preliminary status and that the manuscripts should not be considered for clinical application, nor relied upon for news reporting as established information. 

In January 2022, there were over 10,000 preprints released on medRxiv, which is a 50% increase compared to January 2020.

The site was founded in 2019 by John Inglis and Richard Sever of Cold Spring Harbor Laboratory (CSHL), Theodora Bloom and Claire Rawlinson of BMJ (the medical publisher), and Joseph Ross and Harlan Krumholz of Yale University. The server is owned and operated by CSHL.

medRxiv, and its sister site, bioRxiv, have been major sources for the dissemination of research on COVID-19.

Since February, 2020 medRxiv indexed in PubMed.

See also 
 List of preprint repositories
 ArXiv

References

External links 
 

Eprint archives
Open-access archives